Jacobabad Junction railway station is located in Jacobabad, Sindh, Pakistan. Jacobabad serves as a major junction for Pakistan Railways network with tracks branching off to Kot Addu (via Dera Ghazi Khan). It is staffed and has a booking office.

History
In 1906, it was converted into a junction.

Train routes
The routes are Jacobabad from linked with Lahore, Karachi, Peshawar, Rawalpindi, Quetta, Multan, Faisalabad, Hyderabad, Rohri, Sukkur, Bahawalpur, Dera Ghazi Khan, Kot Adu, Gujrat, Larkana, Gujranwala, Khanewal, Nawabshah, Attock, Dadu,  and Nowshera.

Train services from Jacobabad

See also
 Pakistan Railways
 Jacobabad
 Jacobabad Tehsil
 Jacobabad District

References

Railway stations in Jacobabad District
Railway stations on Rohri–Chaman Railway Line
Railway stations on Kotri–Attock Railway Line (ML 2)
Railway stations on Larkana–Jacobabad line
Railway stations in Sindh